Levites or Levi are Jewish males who are  patrilineal descent from the Tribe of Levi. The Tribe of Levi descended from Levi, the third son of Jacob and Leah. The surname Halevi, which consists of the Hebrew definite article "" Ha- ("the") plus Levi (Levite) is not conclusive regarding being a Levite; a titular use of HaLevi indicates being a Levite. The daughter of a Levite is a "Bat Levi" (Bat being Hebrew for "daughter").

The Tribe of Levi served particular religious duties for the Israelites and had political (administering cities of refuge) and educational responsibilities as well. In return, the landed tribes were expected to support the Levites with a tithe, particularly the tithe known as the First tithe, ma'aser rishon. The Kohanim, a subset of the Levites, were the priests, who performed the work of holiness in the Temple. The Levites, referring to those who were not Kohanim, were specifically assigned to 
 singing and/or playing music in the Temple
 serving as guards
 carrying

When Joshua led the Israelites into the land of Canaan, the Sons of Levi were the only Israelite tribe that received cities but were not allowed to be landowners "because the Lord the God of Israel Himself is their inheritance".

In modern times, Levites are integrated in Jewish communities, but keep a distinct status. There are estimated 300,000 Levites among Ashkenazi Jewish communities, and a similar number among Sephardic and Mizrahi Jews combined. The total percentage of Levites among the wider Jewish population is about 4%.

In contemporary Jewish practice
Today, Levites in Orthodox Judaism continue to have additional rights and obligations compared to lay people, although these responsibilities have diminished with the destruction of the Temple. For instance, Kohanim are eligible to be called to the Torah first, followed by the Levites. Levites also provide assistance to the Kohanim, particularly washing their hands, before the Kohanim recite the Priestly Blessing.

Since Levites (and Kohanim) are traditionally pledged to Divine service, there is no Pidyon HaBen (redemption of the firstborn) ceremony for:
 the son of a Kohen's or a Levite's daughter
 the son of a Kohen or a Levite.

Orthodox Judaism believes in the eventual rebuilding of a Temple in Jerusalem and a resumption of the Levitical role. A small number of schools, primarily in Israel, train priests and Levites in their respective roles.

Conservative Judaism - which believes in a restoration of the Temple as a house of worship and in some special role for Levites, although not the ancient sacrificial system as previously practised - recognizes Levites as having special status. Not all Conservative congregations call Kohanim and Levites to the first and second reading of the Torah, and many no longer perform rituals such as the Priestly Blessing and Pidyon HaBen in which Kohanim and Levites have a special role.

Reconstructionist and Reform Judaism do not observe the distinctions between Kohanim, Levites, and other Jews.

Relationship with Kohanim

The Kohanim are traditionally believed and halachically required to be of direct patrilineal descent from the biblical Aaron of the Tribe of Levi. The origins of the name/term "Levy" in Hebrew remain unclear. Some hypotheses link this name with the Hebrew root lwh, the Aramaic root lwy, or the Arabic root lwy.

The noun kohen is used in the Torah to refer to priests, both Israelite and non-Israelite, such as the Israelite nation as a whole, as well as the priests (Hebrew kohanim) of Baal. During the existence of the Temple in Jerusalem, Kohanim performed the daily and holiday (Yom Tov) duties of sacrificial offerings.

Today kohanim retain a lesser though somewhat distinct status within Judaism, and are bound by additional restrictions according to Orthodox Judaism. During the Priestly Blessing, the Levites traditionally wash the hands of the Kohanim prior to the blessing of the House of Israel. ("A first-born son washes the Kohen's hands if there is no Levite".)

Bat Levi

In Orthodox Judaism, children of a Bat Levi, like those of a Bat-Kohen, regardless of the child's father's tribe or the mother's marital status, retain the traditional exemption for their children from the requirement of being redeemed through the Pidyon HaBen.

Conservative Judaism permits a Bat Levi to perform essentially all the rituals a male Levi would perform, including being called to the Torah for the Levite aliyah in those Conservative synagogues which have both retained traditional tribal roles and modified traditional gender roles. In Israel, Conservative/Masorti Judaism has not extended Torah honors either to  a bat Kohen or to a bat Levi.

The Levites and the Holocaust

In 1938, with the outbreak of violence that would come to be known as Kristallnacht, American Orthodox rabbi Menachem HaKohen Risikoff wrote about the central role he saw for Priests and Levites in terms of Jewish and world responses, in worship, liturgy, and teshuva, repentance. In The Priests and the Levites (1940), he stressed that members of these groups exist in the realm between history (below) and redemption (above), and must act in a unique way to help move others to prayer and action, and help bring an end to suffering. He wrote, "Today, we also are living through a time of flood, Not of water, but of a bright fire, which burns and turns Jewish life into ruin. We are now drowning in a flood of blood. ... Through the Kohanim and Levi'im help will come to all Israel."

Levite population

Levite Y-chromosome studies
A 2003 study of the Y-chromosome by Behar et al. pointed to multiple origins for Ashkenazi Levites, who comprise approximately 4% among the Ashkenazi Jews. It found that Haplogroup R1a1a (R-M17), uncommon in the Middle East or among Sephardi Jews, is present in over 50% of Ashkenazi Levites, while the rest of Ashkenazi Levites' paternal lineage is of certain Middle Eastern origin, including Y-chromosome haplogroups E3b, J2, F, R1b, K, I, Q, N and L. Haplogroup R1a1a is found at the highest levels among people of Eastern European descent, with 50 to 65% among Sorbs, Poles, Russians, and Ukrainians. In South Asia, R1a1a has often been observed with high frequency in a number of demographic groups, reaching over 70% in West Bengal Brahmins in India and among the Mohani tribe in Sindh province in Pakistan. Behar suggested a founding event, probably involving one or very few European men, occurring at a time close to the initial formation and settlement of the Ashkenazi community as a possible explanation. As Nebel, Behar and Goldstein speculate,

although neither the NRY haplogroup composition of the majority of Ashkenazi Jews nor the microsatellite haplotype composition of the R1a1 haplogroup within Ashkenazi Levites is consistent with a major Khazar or other European origin, as has been speculated by some authors (Baron 1957; Dunlop 1967; Ben-Sasson 1976; Keys 1999), one cannot rule out the important contribution of a single or a few founders among contemporary Ashkenazi Levites."

A 2013 paper by Siiri Rootsi et al. confirmed a Near or Middle Eastern origin for all Ashkenazi Levites, including the R1a Y-chromosome carriers, and refuted the Khazar origin: 

In a later 2017 study Behar et al. revised their initially mitigated position, concluding that a "Middle Eastern origin of the Ashkenazi Levite lineage based on what was previously a relatively limited number of reported samples, can now be considered firmly validated", precising that a "rich variation of haplogroup R1a outside of Europe which is phylogenetically separate from the typically European R1a branches", referring to the R1a-Y2619 sub-clade.

Lineage
Having a last name of Levi or a related term does not necessarily mean a person is a Levite, and many well-known Levites do not have such last names.

Levitical status is passed down in families from father to child born from a Jewish mother, as part of a family's genealogical tradition. Tribal status of Levite is determined by patrilineal descent, so a child whose biological father is a Levite (in cases of adoption or artificial insemination, status is determined by the genetic father), is also considered a Levite. Jewish status is determined by matrilineal descent, thus conferring levitical status onto children requires both biological parents to be Israelites and the biological father to be a Levite.

Accordingly, there is currently no branch of Judaism that regards levitical status as conferrable by matrilineal descent. It is either conferrable patrilineally with a Jewish mother, in the traditional manner, or it does not exist and is not conferred at all.

Levite surnames
Some Levites have adopted a related last name to signify their status. Because of diverse geographical locations, the names have several variations:
 Alouwi – Arabic variant, of Sephardic origin
 Aguiló – surname to the Jews from Mallorca (Xuetes).
 Bazes – a Levite surname.
 Benveniste – a Sephardic Levite surname.
 Epstein – one of the European lineages descended from Zerahiah Ha-Levi of Sepharad
 HaLevi, Halevi and Halevy – Hebrew language and all translate to "the Levi" or "the Levite".
 Horowitz HaLevi, or simply Horowitz/Hurwitz/Gurvich/Gurevich – a European Levite surname, tracing to Isaiah Horowitz HaLevi, a descendant of Zerahiah Ha-Levi of Sepharad
 Lavi – a common Levite surname
 Leefsma – Frisian surname.
 Leevi – Finnish variation.
 Lev – simplified Russian variation of Levi
 Levai, Lévai and Lévay – a Levitic surname, originally meaning "a person from Levice" but today it is used by Jews who were forced to change their name during the Holocaust.
 Leven – Swedish variation.
 Levente – Hungarian variation.
 Lévi, Levi, Lévy or Levy – Hebrew for "Levite", equally common in Ashkenasic and Sephardic groups.
 Levian/Livian/Benlevi/Liviem – Persian-Jewish variations.
 Lević, also Levinić, Prelević – Croatian or Serbian variations.
Sometimes supplemented with German "thal" (valley) to Levinthal or Leventhal and -sohn and -son to Levinson or Levinsohn as a patronymic, and with Slavic -ski and -sky suffixes Levinski, Levinsky, Lewinski and Lewinsky (the "e" often replaced with "a" in German areas).
 Levit, also Levitt – typically from the Bessarabia region of Romania, Moldova and southern Ukraine.
 Levita – Elia Levita, an ancestor of David Cameron
 Leviyev – the Russified surname (adding the yev/ev) that many Bukharian Jews of Central Asia have. Sometimes spelled Leviev or even Levaev.
 Lewi or Lewj (Polish, Levi and Levy)
 Lewicki – Polish "of the Levites", also Lewicka, Lewycka, Lewycki, Lewycky, Lewicky, Levicki, Levicky (can also originate from placenames in Poland).
 Lewita – Polish Levite or Levita Latinized, with Slavic suffix -an/in Lewitan, Levitan, Levitin, Lewitin, Lewitinn, and with additional suffix -ski/sky Levitanski, Lewitanski, Levitansky, also Lewitas, Levitas,  Lithuanian, Belorussian, Leyva Spanish Sephardic, also but rare Lefite, Lafite, Lafitte, of French Sephardic origin.
 Variants from Yiddish Leyvik, a pet form of Leyvi: Levitch Ukrainian variant,  also Levicz, Levis, Levitz, Lewicz, Lewitz, Lewis, and with -ski and -sky suffixes Leviczky, Levitski, Levitsky, Lewitski and Lewitsky ("e" and "s" often replaced with "a" and "z" in German areas).
 Loewy, Löwi, Löwy and Loewe German or Swiss variations (although the usual origin for these names is Löwe, the German word for "lion").
 Segal – shortened "Segen Levi" (secondary Levite)
 Urfali or Levi Urfali (also Levi Abud, Levi Aslan, Levi Hamami) – an Urfalim community surname, which was mostly Levite in origin
 Zemmel – shortened "Zecher mi-Shevet Levi" (descendant of the Levite tribe)

Modern Levites
The following are some Levites with non-Levite-like last names in modern times:
 Frank Gehry
 Chaim Herzog
 Norman Lear

See also
 Kohen
 Samaritans
 Urfalim

Explanatory footnotes 
 Levites comprise a subgroup of about 4% of world Jewry. Combined with Kohanim, who are also Levites, the subgroup forms roughly 8% of the Jewish population worldwide, or about 1–1.1 million. Levites also comprise one of the four surviving families of Samaritans, where they serve the role of High Priests due to the fact that the last Samaritan High Priest Cohanic family went extinct in the 17th century.

References

Further reading

External links
 Twenty-four places in tanach where the Kohanim are called Levi'im – Kehuna.org
 The Cohen-Levi Family Heritage
 LeviteDNA.org – website on R1a Ashkenazi Levites

 
Hebrew Bible words and phrases
Jewish ethnic groups
Jewish religious occupations
Book of Numbers people